Werner Hofmann (born November 11, 1952 in Baden-Baden) is a German professor of physics. He is director of the Max Planck Institute for Nuclear Physics in Heidelberg.

Life and work

Hofmann studied physics at the University of Karlsruhe, completing his studies with a doctorate in 1977. In 1980 he wrote his Habilitationsschrift at the University of Dortmund. In 1981 he received a Heisenberg Scholarship and from 1984 to 1987 he worked as assistant and associate professor at the University of California, Berkeley, where he was appointed full professor of physics in 1987. Since 1988 he is director at the Max Planck Institute for Nuclear Physics in Heidelberg. In 1989 he also received an honorary professorship at the University of Heidelberg. Since 2010, he is a member of the Heidelberg Academy of Sciences.

Hofmann's research areas include astroparticle physics, specifically high-energy gamma-ray astrophysics of detectors on the ground; CP violation; physics of heavy quarks; neutrinoless double beta decay; QCD; quark and gluon fragmentation; and physics of jets. He is senior scientist in the High Energy Stereoscopic System (H.E.S.S.) experiment in Namibia.

According to Geoffrey C. Fox, Hofmann's 1981 monograph Jets of Hadrons is "thorough" and "well-written".

Awards
In 2010, he received, with the H.E.S.S. team, the Bruno Rossi Prize. In 2015, he was awarded the Marian Smoluchowski Emil Warburg Prize of the Polish Physical Society and the German Physical Society and in 2016 he received Stern–Gerlach Medal.

References

External links
CV Werner Hofmann
PARTICLE PHYSICS AND HIGH-ENERGY ASTROPHYSICS
Max-Planck-Gesellschaft: Hon.-Prof. Werner Hofmann

1952 births
Living people
20th-century German physicists
21st-century German physicists